Three Nunataks are three nunataks, largely ice-covered, lying 2 nautical miles (3.7 km) southwest of Haven Mountain at the northwest edge of the Britannia Range. Named by the Darwin Glacier Party of the Commonwealth Trans-Antarctic Expedition, 1956–58.

Nunataks of Oates Land